Keaton Nigel Cooke is an American film actor, television actor, and singer. He made his television debut in Difficult People (2015) and his film debut in Wiener-Dog (2016).

Career
Keaton Nigel Cooke is an American film actor, television actor, and singer. He started his acting career at five years old playing the lead role of Mowgli in the Jungle Book. After several more lead roles in stage productions, he was cast as Ryder Silverman in the TV series Difficult People (2015), followed by the role of Hudson in the TV series I Love You...But I Lied (2015). His first lead role in a movie came in Todd Solondz's dark satire Wiener Dog, where he played the young boy Remi (2016). Keaton was a lead actor again in Norman Lear: Just Another Version of You, where he played Norman Lear as a boy (2016). Both movies went to the Sundance Film Festival, where Keaton was the only lead actor with two movies. Alex and the Handyman was a black comedy in which Keaton played Alex (2017). The short won critical acclaim and Keaton was awarded best actor by N.Y.U.. He played Abraham Lincoln's beloved son, Willie, in Lincoln in the Bardo, a boy who died young and is visited by his bereaved father in the graveyard (2017). Keaton played the lead character Simon in a Bread Factory, Part One, and the follow-up movie, A Bread Factory Part Two. The general storyline is a small town theater setting taking on big themes of social institutions and changing technologies in which Keaton plays the cameraman (2018). Adult Ed. is a TV comedy where Keaton plays the wise-cracking son named Toby (2019). Keaton recently played the lead role Josh in a movie called La Bamba. This movie is currently in post-production (2019).
- IMDb Mini Biography By: K. Cooke

Filmography

Film

Television

References

External links
 

21st-century American male actors
American male child actors
American male film actors
American male television actors
Living people
Place of birth missing (living people)
Year of birth missing (living people)